Keith D. Allen (born July 12, 1974) is an American football coach. He served as the head football coach at Southwest Baptist University from 2007 to 2012, compiling a record of 27–39.  His 27 wins are the most in the history of Southwest Baptist's football program, which began play in 1983.

Coaching career
Allen began coaching as a student coach at the University of Oklahoma under defensive coordinator Bill Young and head coach John Blake.  After completing his degree in civil engineering, Allen stayed on in 1997 as the graduate assistant, working on defense.  From there, Allen served as cornerbacks coach at Northeast Louisiana University—now the University of Louisiana at Monroe.  After the 1998 season, Allen then took a position on Dennis Franchione's staff at Texas Christian University.  In 2000, Allen left for Quincy University to be the defensive coordinator and special teams coordinator.  In 2002, Allen left Quincy to be the defensive backs coach and special teams coordinator at San Jose State University.  In 2005, he moved to Southwest Baptist University as defensive coordinator.  Allen was elevated to interim head coach in 2007 after the resignation of Jack Peavey.  Allen was then named head football coach at the conclusion of the 2007 season. He currently coaches football and teaches engineering at The King's Academy in South Florida.

Head coaching record

College

References

External links
 

1974 births
Living people
Louisiana–Monroe Warhawks football coaches
Oklahoma Sooners football coaches
Quincy Hawks football coaches
San Jose State Spartans football coaches
Southwest Baptist Bearcats football coaches
TCU Horned Frogs football coaches
High school football coaches in Florida
University of Oklahoma alumni
Sportspeople from Tulsa, Oklahoma